WSSA may refer to:

 Weed Science Society of America
 Western Social Science Association
 World Sport Stacking Association
 WIGO used the call letters from 1968 until 2007.